Theoleptos of Philadelphia (ca. 1250–1322) was a Byzantine monk, Metropolitan of Philadelphia (1283/4–1322) and Eastern Orthodox theologian.

Life
Theoleptos was born in Nicaea ca. 1250. He married but left his wife in 1275 to become a monk. He spent time in the monastic community of Mount Athos, where he became impregnated with the mystical traditions of Orthodox monasticism, so that the 14th-century bishop and theologian Gregory Palamas regarded him as a forerunner of his own mystical doctrine of Hesychasm. Theoleptos was a strong opponent of the union of the Eastern Orthodox and Roman Catholic Churches which was agreed at the Council of Lyons in 1274, and was imprisoned by the Byzantine emperor Michael VIII Palaiologos (r. 1259–82). After the death of Michael VIII, however, his successor Andronikos II Palaiologos (r. 1282–1328) reversed course; Theoleptos was released and became metropolitan bishop of Philadelphia (present-day Alaşehir in Turkey) in 1283 or 1284.

Theoleptos remained in his see for forty years until his death, and played a decisive role in the affairs of the city during this period, most notably leading the city's successful defence against a Turkish attack in 1310. Theoleptos opposed the reconciliation of the official Church with the Arsenite faction in 1310, resulting in a schism between himself and the Patriarchate of Constantinople that lasted until ca. 1319. Theoleptos maintained close ties with the influential Choumnos family: the statesman and scholar Nikephoros Choumnos composed an eulogy on Theoleptos' death, while the metropolitan served as spiritual advisor to Nikephoros' daughter, Irene Choumnaina, the founder and abbotess of the Monastery of Christ Philanthropos in Constantinople. It is through his correspondence with her that his theological views are best known.

Some of Theoleptos' writings are found in the Philokalia, but most of his writings remain unpublished. The writings of Theoleptos are a great contribution for the modern understanding of Byzantine mysticism and theology just prior to the Hesychast controversy.

References

Sources

Further reading
 
 
 
 
 
 

1250s births
1322 deaths
13th-century Byzantine bishops
14th-century Byzantine bishops
13th-century Christian mystics
14th-century Christian mystics
Byzantine prisoners and detainees
Byzantine theologians
People from Nicaea
Prisoners and detainees of the Byzantine Empire
History of Manisa Province
Eastern Orthodox mystics
Eastern Orthodox theologians
Alaşehir
14th-century Eastern Orthodox theologians
13th-century Eastern Orthodox theologians
Philokalia